Aiko Kitahara  was a Japanese novelist. She is best known for writing historical novels.

Early life and career 
Kitahara was born  on January 20, 1938, in what is now Minato, Tokyo. She graduated from Chiba Girls High School in 1956. After graduating she worked briefly at an oil company and then a photography studio, before landing a position as a copywriter for an advertising firm.

Career 
Kitahara began writing while working at the advertising firm. In 1969 her story  won the Shincho Prize. Another story she wrote received an honorable mention in the same year. She then pivoted to writing historical novels. Her 1989 novel  won the Izumi Kyoka Prize for Literature. In 1993 she won the Naoki Prize for her , which was a collection of six intertwined stories. It was later translated to English as "The Budding Tree: Six Stories of Love in Edo" by Ian MacDonald.

In 1997 her story  won the Women's Literature Prize. Her book series "Keijiro Engawa Nikki" was adapted into a television drama starring Hideki Takahashi in 2004.

In 2005 her story  won the Yoshikawa Eiji literary award.

Kitahara died of a heart attack in Tokyo on March 12, 2013.

Style 
In her historical fiction Kitahara focuses on the struggles of the lower class, especially women. Her protagonists tend to be confident, independent working women who struggle to make their way in the world without the support of fathers or husbands. Her work criticizes the social injustices that occurred during the 19th century, but Publishers Weekly wrote in a review that the protagonists' struggles will also resonate with modern readers.

Bibliography 

  series, 1989-2013
  series, 1998-2014

References 

1938 births
2013 deaths
20th-century Japanese novelists
People from Tokyo
Naoki Prize winners